Statistics of Primera División de México in season 1944–45.

Overview
It was contested by 13 teams, and Club España won the championship.

Teams

League standings

Results

Moves
After this season Monterrey, Tampico, and San Sebastián joined.

References
Mexico - List of final tables (RSSSF)
- Mexico 1944/45 (RSSSF)

1944-45
Mex
1944–45 in Mexican football